The history of Jainism in Australia is relatively short when compared to the history of Christianity on the same continent. There are four Jain centres in Australia. The Jain population in Australia was counted in the 2016 census to be 4,047, of whom 38% lived in Greater Sydney, 31% in Greater Melbourne, and 15% in Greater Perth. The states and territories with the highest proportion of Jains are Western Australia (0.025%) and Victoria (0.022%), whereas those with the lowest are Queensland (0.006%) and Tasmania (0.001%).

History
The Jain community established itself in Australia through immigration. A Jain society has been formed in Sydney.

Exodus of Asians from Uganda in 1972 due to Idi Amin's policies, forced some Jains to migrate elsewhere, like Australia.

Jain Centres
Jain centres and/or societies have been established in Sydney, Perth, Brisbane, Canberra, Adelaide, and Melbourne. Most of the centres practice Jain unity by making sure every Jain sect comes and prays together. The first two Jain Tirthankars in Australia were established in Hindu temples in Sydney and in Canberra. First Jain association in Australia was formed in Sydney and named Sydney Jain Mandal. Another Jain association in Sydney is known as Vitraag Jain Shwetambar Sangh  There is also a community-driven centre — AAJ (meaning 'Today' in Hindi) that serves Jain community in Australia.

See also

 List of Jain temples
 Jainism in Europe
 Jainism in Hong Kong
 Jainism in India
 Jainism in the United States

References

External links